George William Campbell Dixon  (10 December 1895, Ouse, Tasmania – 25 May 1960, London) was an Australian and British journalist, publicist and playwright. He was an employee of the Hobart newspaper The Mercury, Melbourne's The Argus and The Herald, and London's Daily Mail; from 1931 until his death, he headed the film criticism division of The Daily Telegraph. In 1950, he served as president of the Critics' Circle.

Dixon's plays formed the basis for the scripts of the films Isle of Escape (1930), directed by Howard Bretherton; Secret Agent (1936), directed by Alfred Hitchcock; and, according to one version, the film Freedom Radio (1941) by Anthony Asquith.

References

Bibliography

External links 
 
 

The Daily Telegraph people
1895 births
1960 deaths
People from Tasmania
Australian film critics
British film critics
English male dramatists and playwrights
20th-century British dramatists and playwrights
20th-century Australian journalists
20th-century British journalists
English male journalists
Daily Mail journalists
Naturalised citizens of the United Kingdom
Presidents of the Critics' Circle
The Herald (Melbourne) people
The Argus (Melbourne) people
The Mercury (Hobart) people
20th-century English businesspeople
Australian emigrants to the United Kingdom